Matthew Anthony Brown (born 15 March 1990) is an English footballer who plays as a defender for AFC Telford United.

Career
Brown began his career in the youth teams at Tranmere Rovers and Manchester City before playing semi-professional football with Northwich Victoria and Marine. While he played for Marine he also worked a full-time job at telecoms company MJ Quinn as the coordinator of the Scotland patch. He went on trial at League side Chesterfield in the summer of 2013 which was a success and he joined the Spireites on a one-year contract. In October 2013 he joined Conference Premier side Southport on loan where he played five times scoring once against Cambridge United. He made his Football League debut on 14 December 2013 against Plymouth Argyle and scored in a 2–0 victory, however he was later sent-off. Chesterfield successfully appealed against his dismissal and his ban was rescinded.

On 7 February 2014, Brown linked up with Chester on an initial one-month loan deal, but remained there until the end of the season.

On 13 May 2014, Chesterfield announced that Brown had been released.

On 21 Sept 2020, York City announced that Brown had signed for them following his release from Halifax Town. When asked about Brown for the signing, manager Steve Watson described Brown as “Physically [he is] very dominant, dominant vocally as well but apart from that a very good footballer, I very rarely sign players who can’t handle the ball. He’s actually a very good passer of the ball as well which suits the way we always try and play.”.

Following promotion through the play-offs with York City, Brown returned to the National League North to join AFC Telford United.

Career statistics

A.  The "Other" column constitutes appearances and goals in the FA Trophy, Lancashire FA Challenge Trophy, Liverpool Senior Cup.

Honours
FC Halifax Town
FA Trophy: 2015–16

References

External links

1990 births
Living people
English footballers
Association football defenders
Chesterfield F.C. players
Northwich Victoria F.C. players
Marine F.C. players
Southport F.C. players
Chester F.C. players
FC Halifax Town players
York City F.C. players
AFC Telford United players
English Football League players
National League (English football) players